Vendée Challans Basket is a French basketball club based in the city of Challans and playing in NM1.

History
The club was founded in 1936 as Étoile Sportive du Marais Challans. Under the abbreviated name ESM Challans in 1971 the team was promoted to the first division of the French Basketball Championship, the National 1. There Challans finished in seventh place, which represented the beginning of the establishment in the first division. In the 1975-76 season the team came out seventh  in final standings and acquired a right to the FIBA Korać Cup of the next season. There, they lost despite a strong 69-58 victory in the second leg against Cannon Venezia, since the first leg was clearly lost. The sixth place in 1977-78 league season was reached again, it was followed by the second part in the Korać Cup. This time the club eliminated by the Spaniards of Cotonificio. After many years in the top league, the benefits were finally worse, the descent into the second division could not be prevented in the season 1981-82.

However, in 1983 Challans failed to resurgence. In addition, the same year the club won the French basketball trophy for unterklassige teams against CRO Lyon. After the first season was ended after the climb to 10th place, the team tied in the 1984-85 season on the successes of the past and was re-sixth. On his third participation in the Korać Cup the club for the first time succeeded in gaining the last 16, and thereby reach the group stage, but where managed just one win in six games. Despite the double burden once more the sixth place in the league has been reached. In the Korać Cup participation 1986-87 the team sold properly at Estudiantes Madrid and Mobilgirgi Caserta, but failed in the group.

In 1987 although Challans still qualified for the inaugural play-offs for the French League and was there until the quarter-finals, the club withdrew voluntarily from the professional basketball back and started again in 1993 in the fourth division. The return to one of the top leagues no longer managed the club. In 2004, the club was renamed in Vendée Challans Basket and plays since 2005 in the third-highest division, the National 1.

Name through history

Honours
French Cup
 Winners (1): 1982-83

Notable players
  Barry White (1973–78)
  Murray Brown 
  Bruno Constant (1979–87)
  Valéry Demory (1983–87)
  Kevin Figaro (1984–87)
  Philippe Hervé (1985–86)
  Lance Berwald (1985–86)
  Seán Ring (2018-present)

Basketball teams in France
Basketball teams established in 1936